Sulafa Refaat Memar was born on 26 April 1976 in Damascus. She is a well known Syrian actress who began her career in 1994. Soulafa studied at the Higher Institute of Dramatic Arts in Damascus, Syria and acted in TV and cinema. She won Best Arab actress award in Oran Arab Film Festival for her role in ‘Taht Al Sakef’.

Personal life
Sulafa Memar was born in Damascus but she is originally from Aqarib village in Hama Governorate. In 2002 she married a Syrian actor and director named Saif Aldin Alsubaei and later she gave birth to her daughter Dahab in 2006. She got divorced in 2012.

Works

Series
 Five-star family (1994)
 Family issue (1999)
 Kan ya makan (2000)
 Salah Al-deen Al-Ayyobi (2001)
 Light spot 1 (2001)
 Alo Jamil Alo Hana (2001)
  Flowers in salty soil (2002)
 Time conflict (2002)
 Before Sunset (2003)
 House of pride (2003)
 Little thorns (2005)
 Hide hatred (2005)
 Baibars (2005)
 People of love 1 (2006)
 Time of fear (2007)
 Its not mirage (2008)
 Yasmin collar (2008)
 Another raining day (2008)
 Partners divide destruction (2008)
 Zaman Al'ar (2009)
 Eastern bed (2010)
 People of flag 2 (2010)
 Ma Malokat emanokom (2010)
 The forgiving (2011)
 The Mirage (2011)
 Toq (2011)
 Naked souls (2012)
 Alkhawaja Abdul qader (2012)
 Sanaoud Baad Kalil (2013)
 Khaybar (2013)
 Lipstick pencil (2014)
 Bint Shahbandar (2015)
 The godfather (2015)
 Domino (2016)
 Khatoon (2016)
 People of love 3 (2017)
 Levantine rose (2017)
 Windows (2017)
 Orchedea (2017)
 Khatoon 2 (2017)
 Harmalak (2018)
 Safe space (2019)
Haret Al-Qube (2021)

Film
 Mother project (2002)
 Public relationships (2005)
 Under sling (2005)

Voice
 Ai no Gakko Cuore Monogatari

References

External links
 Sulafa Mimar  at IMDb

1976 births
Living people
20th-century Syrian actresses
21st-century Syrian actresses
Syrian television actresses
Syrian film actresses
People from Damascus